Events from the year 1992 in France.

Incumbents
 President: François Mitterrand 
 Prime Minister: Édith Cresson (until 2 April) Pierre Bérégovoy (starting 2 April)

Events
22 March – Regional Elections held.
22 March – Cantonales Elections held.
29 March – Cantonales Elections held.
12 April – Euro Disney resort and theme park opens to the east of Paris.
17 June – The France's pursuit of the Euro 92 are ended by a 2–1 defeat to Denmark in the final group game in Sweden.
20 September – Maastricht Treaty referendum held, with a small majority in favour of ratification of the Maastricht Treaty.
8 October – Launch of the Renault Twingo, an entry level car which takes on a ground-breaking one-box design and will compete with the likes of the new Fiat Cinquecento.
17 November – Start of the "couscous connection" trial in which Habib Ben Ali, the younger brother of the President of Tunisia is accused of laundering drug money.

Arts and literature
9 April – Jean-François Deniau, essayist and novelist, elected to the Académie française.
12 April – Disneyland Paris officially opens under the name "EuroDisney".
20 December – The Folies Bergère music hall in Paris closes.

Sport
8 February – The opening ceremony for the 1992 Winter Olympics is held in Albertville.
23 February – The closing ceremony of the 1992 Winter Olympics is held.
5 May – Armand Césari Stadium disaster in Bastia, Corsica, when one of the terraces collapsed, killing 18 people.
4 July – Tour de France begins.
5 July – French Grand Prix won by Nigel Mansell of the United Kingdom.
26 July – Tour de France ends, won by Miguel Indurain of Spain.

Births
 17 January
 Dounia Abdourahim, handball player
 Laura Augé, swimmer
 22 January – Benjamin Jeannot, footballer
 19 February – Marie Annequin, swimmer
 21 February – Gauthier Mahoto, footballer
 25 February – Annaïg Butel, footballer
 3 March – Sega Keita, footballer
 10 March – Neeskens Kebano, footballer
 30 March – Abdoulaye Diallo, footballer
 31 March – William Gros, footballer
 6 April – Mikail Albayrak, footballer
 10 April – Najib Ammari, footballer
 13 April – Melodie Monrose, model
 24 April – Sigrid Agren, model
 29 April – Gaël N'Lundulu, footballer
 30 April – Mike Cestor, footballer
 11 May – Pierre-Ambroise Bosse, middle-distance athlete
 14 May – Anthony Derouard, footballer
 18 May – Kevin Mendy, basketball player
 22 May – Camille Lou, singer
 28 May – Stéphane Bahoken, footballer
 9 June
 Yannick Agnel, swimmer
 Dennis Appiah, footballer
 16 June – Alexandre Jallier, French basketball player
 17 June – Hugo Valente, French auto racing driver
 18 June
 Rachid Alioui, footballer
 Adama Soumaoro, footballer
 22 June – Terence Makengo, footballer
 6 August – Mehdi Abeid, footballer
 19 August – Estelle Mossely, Boxer
 4 September – Layvin Kurzawa, footballer
 12 September – Gilbert Imbula, footballer
 15 September – Camélia Jordana, pop singer
 11 October – Jean-Daniel Akpa Akpro, footballer
 25 October – Clarisse Agbegnenou, judoka
 7 November – Agnès Raharolahy, sprinter
 1 December – Quentin Bigot, hammer thrower
 2 December – Massadio Haïdara, footballer
 12 December – Félix Maritaud, actor 
 24 December – Serge Aurier, footballer

Deaths

January to June
21 January – Bernard Cornut-Gentille, administrator and politician (born 1909).
1 February – Jean Hamburger, physician, surgeon and essayist (born 1909).
20 February – Pierre Dervaux, operatic conductor and composer (born 1917).
14 March – Jean Poiret, actor, director and screenwriter (born 1926).
16 March – Yves Rocard, physicist (born 1903).
20 March – Georges Delerue, film composer (born 1925).
30 March – Amédée Fournier, cyclist (born 1912).
27 April – Olivier Messiaen, composer, organist and ornithologist (born 1908).
5 May – Jean-Claude Pascal, costume designer and singer (born 1927).
30 June – André Hébuterne, painter (born 1894).

July to December
24 July – Arletty, singer and actress (born 1898).
2 August – Michel Berger, singer and songwriter (born 1947).
19 August – Jean-Albert Grégoire, car pioneer (born 1899).
29 August – Félix Guattari, militant, institutional psychotherapist and philosopher (born 1930).
16 September – Henri Legay, operatic tenor (born 1920).
15 October – Paul Paillole, soldier (born 1905).
29 November
 Jean Dieudonné, mathematician (born 1906).
 Raoul Ploquin, film producer, production manager and screenwriter.
10 December – Jacques Perret, writer (born 1901).
23 December – Vincent Fourcade, interior designer (born 1934).

Full date unknown
Jules Gros, Breton linguist (born 1890).
Bernard Lefebvre, photographer (born 1906).

See also
 List of French films of 1992

References

1990s in France